Gary Carl (Muhammad) Legenhausen (born May 3, 1953 in New York City) is an American philosopher who teaches at the Imam Khomeini's Educational and Research Institute, which was directed by Mohammad-Taqi Mesbah-Yazdi.

He converted to Islam in 1983. He wrote a book entitled Islam and Religious Pluralism in which he advocates "non-reductive religious pluralism". He has been an advocate of interfaith dialogue, and serves on the advisory board of the Society for Religious Studies in Qom. He holds a Ph.D. in philosophy from Rice University (1983).

He taught philosophy of religion, ethics and epistemology at the Islamic Iranian Academy of Philosophy from 1990 until 1994. Since 1996, he has been studying Islam and teaching Western philosophy and Christianity at the Imam Khomeini Education and Research Institute in Iran. He is also a founding member of the advisory board of the Shi`ite Studies Center in Qom, and serves on the scientific board of the Human Rights Center of Mofid University, Qom.

Brought up as a Catholic, he abandoned religion shortly after beginning his academic studies at the State University of New York at Albany. In 1979, he became acquainted with Islam through Muslim students at Texas Southern University, where he taught from 1979 to 1989. after he was acquainted with Shi’a Islam, he decided to convert his Catholic faith to Islam.

Bibliography
 Mesbah Yazdi, M.T., Philosophical Instructions (translation by Muhammad Legenhausen & Azim Sarvdalir)  Binghamton University & Brigham Young University, 1999, .
 Jesus through the Qur'an and Shi'ite Narrations (translation by Muhammad Legenhausen & Muntazir Qa'im), Tahrike Tarsile Qur'an, Inc., 2005,  (translated into Indonesian and Russian; the Russian translation won a Russian Publishers' Association book award).
 Islam and Religious Pluralism, London: Al-Hoda, 1999,  (translated into Persian, Arabic and Indonesian)
 Contemporary Topics of Islamic Thought, Tehran: Al-Hoda, 2000, ; (translated into Persian)
 "A Muslim's Proposal: Non-Reductive Religious Pluralism".
 Philosophical Instructions: An Introduction to Contemporary Islamic Philosophy
 Soul: A Comparative Approach
 Proofs for the Existence of God: Contexts – Structures – Relevance
 Substance and Attribute: Western and Islamic Traditions in Dialogue
 Contemporary Topics of Islamic Thought
 Hermeneutical Foundations for Islamic Social Sciences
 Islam versus Feminism
 Spirituality in Shi’i Islam: An Overview
 The ‘Irfan Of The Commander Of The Faithful, Imam ‘Ali, Peace Be With Him
 'Allamah Tabataba'i's Footnote to Mulla Sadra's Proof of the Sincere
 Jesus as Kalimat Allah, The Word of God
 Hegel’s Ethics
 Does God Have a Mind?
 Spirituality in Modern Philosophy: Hegel’s Spirituality

References

External links
 Gary Carl (Muhammad) Legenhausen - al-islam.org
 MuhammadLegenhausen - iki.academia.edu
 peacethroughunderstanding.blogspot.com
 The Relationship between Philosophy and Theology in the Postmodern Age
 qom.academia.edu/MuhammadLegenhausen

1953 births
American male writers
American expatriates in Iran
Converts to Shia Islam from Catholicism
University at Albany, SUNY alumni
Rice University alumni
Texas Southern University faculty
Living people
20th-century American philosophers
21st-century American philosophers
American Shia Muslims
Iranian Science and Culture Hall of Fame recipients in Philosophy
Imam Khomeini's Educational and Research Institute